Corey Miller (born March 9, 1971), better known by his stage name C-Murder, is an American rapper and songwriter. He initially gained fame in the mid-1990s as a part of his brother Master P's label No Limit Records, primarily as a member of the label's supergroup, TRU. Miller went on to release several solo albums of his own through the label, including 1998's platinum Life or Death. C-Murder has released nine albums altogether on six different labels, No Limit Records, TRU Records, Koch Records, Asylum Records, RBC Records, and Venti Uno.

In 2002, Miller was arrested in connection with the murder of 16-year-old Steve Thomas, and was sentenced to life in prison on August 14, 2009. Miller is serving his sentence at the Louisiana State Penitentiary. Controversy surrounding witnesses involved in Miller's trial came to light in 2018 when two key witnesses recanted their statements, claiming they had been pressured into testifying against Miller by authorities. Miller maintains his innocence, and he, his brothers, and his nephew have all called for a new trial numerous times.

Early life
Corey Miller was born in Uptown New Orleans, Louisiana on March 9, 1971. He grew up in the Calliope Projects in the Third Ward of New Orleans

Music career 
In 1998, Miller released his first album Life or Death which peaked at No. 3 on the Billboard 200 and was eventually certified platinum.

In 1999, he released Bossalinie which peaked at No. 2 on the Billboard 200 and was certified gold.

In 2000, he released Trapped in Crime which peaked at No. 9 on the Billboard 200. It included the single "Down for My N's" which featured fellow No Limit artists Snoop Dogg and Magic.

In 2001, he released C-P-3.com, his last album with No Limit Records. It peaked at No. 45 on the Billboard 200 and included the singles "What U Gonna Do" and "Im Not Just".

In 2003, he was convicted of the murder of fan Steve Thomas. He recorded three hit albums while under house arrest awaiting re-trial: The Truest Shit I Ever Said (2005) which reached No. 41 on the Billboard 200, Screamin' 4 Vengeance (2008) which reached No. 130, and Calliope Click (2009) which peaked at No. 68 on the Billboard R&B Albums chart.

In 2009, he lost his appeal and pleaded no contest to two counts of attempted murder in an unrelated incident. While in prison he's self-released a mixtape Ricochet (2013) and four albums, Tomorrow (2010), Ain't No Heaven in the Pen (2015), Give Me Freedom Or Give Me Death (2021), and the compilation Oldies but Goodies (2018).

In 2016, he released a diss track accusing rapper 2 Chainz of using the slogan and name style of his former group TRU and record label TRU Global Records.

Other ventures 
Miller acted in the No Limit films Da Game of Life, I Got the Hook Up", and Hot Boyz. He is the author of the novel Death Around The Corner, published by Vibe.

Legal issues

Steve Thomas case 
In September 2003, Miller was convicted of the January 12, 2002 beating and fatal shooting of a fan, 16-year-old Steve Thomas, at the Platinum Club, a now-closed nightclub in Harvey, Louisiana. Miller was arrested in the early hours of January 19 for causing a disturbance at the House of Blues in New Orleans. He was indicted on February 28, 2002. Judge Martha Sassone granted a new trial based on the claim that prosecutors improperly withheld criminal background information on three of their witnesses.

While awaiting re-trial, Miller was placed under house arrest. Sassone allowed Miller to promote his new, yet-to-be-titled CD and his novel, Death around the Corner, while under house arrest, but ruled that a gag order pertaining to the case would remain in effect. The terms of the house arrest required Sassone's permission for all visitors, including reporters.

On March 13, 2007, Sassone granted Miller's request to work on his music career on a per-request basis, but denied his request for a 7:00 a.m. to 9:00 p.m. curfew. Sassone's rulings in the case became an issue in her failed 2008 bid for re-election. Sassone was defeated by Judge Ellen Kovach; prosecutors subsequently renewed a request to have Miller returned to jail. During January 2009, Miller was confined to his residence on house arrest, and could only leave for a documented medical emergency.

On May 27, 2009, Miller pleaded no contest to two counts of attempted second degree murder. These charges stem from a 2001 incident in Baton Rouge in which Miller fired one shot, after which it jammed, from a semi-automatic pistol at the owner and bouncer of a night club who refused to allow Miller to enter the business with the gun. Miller was sentenced to ten years with credit for time served. A surveillance video of the incident was posted on YouTube.

On August 5, 2009, the murder trial began. The father of the victim spoke of his son being a fan of C-Murder before the incident. A bouncer also testified against Miller, saying he witnessed the shooting. He expressed fear of repercussions for his testimony. Prosecutors also charged C-Murder's associates with witness tampering.

On August 10, 2009, the jury reported being deadlocked, but Judge Hans Liljeberg instructed them to attempt to resolve the deadlock. Three hours later, the jury returned to announce it reached a 10–2 guilty verdict. The judge suspected that, given the deadlock announced earlier followed by the quick reversal, one of the jurors decided to switch under pressure to end the trial and instructed the jury to go back and deliberate on the case longer.

When they returned with the same 10–2 verdict, Miller was convicted of second-degree murder. During sentencing, the victim's father said, "I'm not rejoicing. I feel bad for [Miller's] family. But at least they can see him. What have we got but a gravesite and a photograph?" C-Murder was sentenced on August 14 by District Judge Hans Liljeberg to mandatory life imprisonment.

On August 27, 2009, Ernest Johnson, president of the Louisiana NAACP, requested an investigation into the jury deliberations. C-Murder's financial woes reportedly landed him the help of two Harvard attorneys, one of them Ronald Sullivan, who have agreed to assist with his appeal. One of the jurors, Mary Jacob, said that both she and a fellow juror, a 20-year-old student at Xavier University of Louisiana, were verbally abused by fellow jurors for their decision to acquit. According to Jacob, the abuse resulted in her switching her verdict, saying, "They literally made this 20-year-old girl so violently ill, she was shaking so bad. She ran into the bathroom. She was throwing her guts up. She couldn't function anymore. That's when I decided, the judge don't want to listen to me, doesn't want to listen to us? I told them, 'You want him to be guilty? He's guilty; now let's get the hell out of here. This account was partially confirmed by another juror. At the time, a 10–2 consensus was sufficient for conviction in Louisiana but a 9–3 consensus would result in a mistrial. As a result, Miller appealed the conviction.

On December 28, 2011, his conviction was upheld.

On February 19, 2013, the Supreme Court rejected Miller v. Louisiana, which was Miller's final appeal of his conviction. After a jury voted 10–2 to convict Miller, Miller's attorneys argued that because federal juries must reach unanimous verdicts in criminal cases, Miller should have not been convicted in Louisiana.

On April 2, 2014, Miller's attorney, Rachel Conner, filed a post-conviction relief application in state court in Gretna. She raised 10 points to support her assertion that her client received no fair trial. Conner said she plans to raise additional points. Primary among the assertions is what she described as irregularities during the jury's deliberations, stating, "One juror cast a guilty vote not based on the evidence but because she wanted to end deliberations to protect another juror who refused to convict Miller but was targeted by other jurors to change her mind, Conner wrote."

In August 2021, Miller went on hunger strike to protest his conditions, which he feared would result in him getting COVID-19, and the status of his trial, saying he believed the district attorney had withheld evidence. That month, he hired civil rights attorney Benjamin Crump.

Investigation Discovery Reasonable Doubt 
In June 2018, Miller's case was featured on Investigation Discovery Reasonable Doubt. It was on this episode that Kenneth Jordan recanted and discussed his false testimony. Jordan stated he was pressured by detectives to testify against Miller or he himself would have faced a 10-year prison sentence for unrelated criminal charges. On July 6, another witness, Darnell Jordan, recanted his testimony, saying he was detained and locked in a hotel room by the police for refusing to testify against Miller.

Discography

Singles

 The Black Grinch (2020)
 Don't Wanna Trap No More (2021)

Solo albums
 Life or Death (1998)
 Bossalinie (1999)
 Trapped in Crime (2000)
 C-P-3.com (2001)
 Tru Dawgs (2002)
 The Truest Shit I Ever Said (2005)
 Screamin' 4 Vengeance (2008)
 Calliope Click Volume 1 (2009)
 Tomorrow (2010)
 Ain't No Heaven in the Pen (2015)

Collaboration albums 
 Penitentiary Chances (2016) with Boosie Badazz

Filmography

References

External links
 
 Official Instagram profile

1971 births
Living people
2002 murders in the United States
20th-century American male musicians
21st-century American criminals
21st-century American male musicians
21st-century American rappers
African-American male rappers
American male criminals
American male rappers
American murderers of children
American people convicted of attempted murder
American people convicted of murder
American prisoners sentenced to life imprisonment
Crime in Louisiana
Crimes in New Orleans
Criminals from Louisiana
Gangsta rappers
Hunger strikers
Male murderers
MNRK Music Group artists
No Limit Records artists
People convicted of murder by Louisiana
Priority Records artists
Prisoners sentenced to life imprisonment by Louisiana
Rappers from New Orleans